DJK may refer to:

 DJK-Sportverband (Deutsche Jugendkraft Sportverband, German Youth Sport Association)
 Jutland Art Academy (Danish: Det Jyske Kunstakademi), Denmark

People
 Derrell Johnson-Koulianos (born 1987), a former American football player